The 9th Armoured Division is a division of the Syrian Army, established after 1970.

Combat history
As the 9th Infantry Division, it was heavily engaged during the 1973 October War, and in the Valley of Tears.

In April 1976, it was announced by Kamal Junblatt, leader of the Lebanese National Movement, that the 91st Armoured Brigade had entered Lebanon. This was in addition to other Syrian forces that had entered previously.

The 9th Armored Division served in the 1991 Gulf War as the Arab Joint Forces Command North reserve and saw little action.

In 2001 Richard Bennett estimated that its brigades included the 43rd and 91st Armored Brigades and the 52nd Mechanized Brigade. He wrote that it was part of the 1st Corps, which covered from Golan Heights, the fortified zone and south to Der'a near the Jordanian border.

The 52nd Armored Brigade was reported in Der'aa in southern Syria in May 2013.

During the Syrian Civil War it has been involved in the following engagements:
Idlib Governorate clashes (June 2012–April 2013)
2015 Southern Syria offensive (February–March 2015)
Daraa and As-Suwayda offensive (June 2015) (9–15 June 2015)

It was reported in October 2015 that "Syrian armed opposition factions seized the strategic Tel Ahmar in the northern countryside of Quneitra on Saturday, following violent clashes with regime forces. ..The capture of Tel Ahmar comes days after opposition factions seized the Fourth Division of the Syrian army’s Brigade 91 in the same offensive, which aims to break the siege on Western Ghouta."

Battle of Harasta (2017–2018)
2021 Daraa offensive (29 July–5 September 2021)

References

Further reading
Laffin, John (1985) [1982]. Arab Armies of the Middle East Wars 1948-73. Osprey Publishing Ltd. .

https://www.cia.gov/readingroom/docs/CIA-RDP79T00975A030900010090-9.pdf - NAtional Intelligence Daily (Cable) p11

Armoured divisions of Syria